Particle therapy is a form of external beam radiotherapy using beams of energetic neutrons, protons, or other heavier positive ions for cancer treatment. The most common type of particle therapy as of August 2021 is proton therapy.

In contrast to X-rays (photon beams) used in older radiotherapy, particle beams exhibit a Bragg peak in energy loss through the body, delivering their maximum radiation dose at or near the tumor and minimizing damage to surrounding normal tissues.

Particle therapy is also referred to more technically as hadron therapy, excluding photon and electron therapy. Neutron capture therapy, which depends on a secondary nuclear reaction, is also not considered here. Muon therapy, a rare type of particle therapy not within the categories above, has also been attempted however, muons are still most commonly used for imaging, rather than therapy.

Method 

Particle therapy works by aiming energetic ionizing particles at the target tumor. These particles damage the DNA of tissue cells, ultimately causing their death. Because of their reduced ability to repair DNA, cancerous cells are particularly vulnerable to such damage.

The figure shows how beams of electrons, X-rays or protons of different energies (expressed in MeV) penetrate human tissue. Electrons have a short range and are therefore only of interest close to the skin (see electron therapy). Bremsstrahlung X-rays penetrate more deeply, but the dose absorbed by the tissue then shows the typical exponential decay with increasing thickness. For protons and heavier ions, on the other hand, the dose increases while the particle penetrates the tissue and loses energy continuously. Hence the dose increases with increasing thickness up to the Bragg peak that occurs near the end of the particle's range. Beyond the Bragg peak, the dose drops to zero (for protons) or almost zero (for heavier ions).

The advantage of this energy deposition profile is that less energy is deposited into the healthy tissue surrounding the target tissue. This enables higher dose prescription to the tumor, theoretically leading to a higher local control rate, as well as achieving a low toxicity rate.

The ions are first accelerated by means of a cyclotron or synchrotron. The final energy of the emerging particle beam defines the depth of penetration, and hence, the location of the maximum energy deposition. Since it is easy to deflect the beam by means of electro-magnets in a transverse direction, it is possible to employ a raster scan method, i.e., to scan the target area quickly like the electron beam scans a TV tube. If, in addition, the beam energy and hence, the depth of penetration is varied, an entire target volume can be covered in three dimensions, providing an irradiation exactly following the shape of the tumor. This is one of the great advantages compared to conventional X-ray therapy.

At the end of 2008, 28 treatment facilities were in operation worldwide and over 70,000 patients had been treated by means of pions, protons and heavier ions. Most of this therapy has been conducted using protons.

At the end of 2013, 105,000 patients had been treated with proton beams, and approximately 13,000 patients had received carbon-ion therapy.

As of April 1, 2015, for proton beam therapy, there are 49 facilities in the world, including 14 in the US with another 29 facilities under construction. For Carbon-ion therapy, there are eight centers operating and four under construction. Carbon-ion therapy centers exist in Japan, Germany, Italy, and China. Two USA federal agencies are hoping to stimulate the establishment of at least one US heavy-ion therapy center.

Proton therapy
Proton therapy is a type of particle therapy that uses a beam of protons to irradiate diseased tissue, most often to treat cancer. The chief advantage of proton therapy over other types of external beam radiotherapy (e.g., radiation therapy, or photon therapy) is that the dose of protons is deposited over a narrow range of depth, which results in minimal entry, exit, or scattered radiation dose to healthy nearby tissues.

Fast-neutron therapy
Fast neutron therapy utilizes high energy neutrons typically between 50 and 70 MeV to treat cancer. Most fast neutron therapy beams are produced by reactors, cyclotrons (d+Be) and linear accelerators. Neutron therapy is currently available in Germany, Russia, South Africa and the United States. In the United States, three treatment centers are operational in Seattle, Washington, Detroit, Michigan and Batavia, Illinois. The Detroit and Seattle centers use a cyclotron which produces a proton beam impinging upon a beryllium target; the Batavia center at Fermilab uses a proton linear accelerator.

Carbon ion radiotherapy
Carbon ion therapy (C-ion RT) uses particles more massive than protons or neutrons. Carbon ion radiotherapy has increasingly garnered scientific attention as technological delivery options have improved and clinical studies have demonstrated its treatment advantages for many cancers such as prostate, head and neck, lung, and liver cancers, bone and soft tissue sarcomas, locally recurrent rectal cancer, and pancreatic cancer, including locally advanced disease. It also has clear advantages to treat otherwise intractable hypoxic and radio-resistant cancers while opening the door for substantially hypo-fractionated treatment of normal and radio-sensitive disease.

By mid 2017, more than 15,000 patients have been treated worldwide in over 8 operational centers. Japan has been a conspicuous leader in this field. There are five heavy-ion radiotherapy facilities in operation and plans exist to construct several more facilities in the near future. In Germany this type of treatment is available at the Heidelberg Ion-Beam Therapy Center (HIT) and at the Marburg Ion-Beam Therapy Center (MIT). In Italy the National Centre of Oncological Hadrontherapy (CNAO) provides this treatment. Austria will open a CIRT center in 2017, with centers in South Korea, Taiwan, and China soon to open. No CIRT facility now operates in the United States but several are in various states of development.

Biological advantages of heavy-ion radiotherapy
From a radiation biology standpoint, there is considerable rationale to support use of heavy-ion beams in treating cancer patients. All proton and other heavy ion beam therapies exhibit a defined Bragg peak in the body so they deliver their maximum lethal dosage at or near the tumor. This minimizes harmful radiation to the surrounding normal tissues. However, carbon-ions are heavier than protons and so provide a higher relative biological effectiveness (RBE), which increases with depth to reach the maximum at the end of the beam's range. Thus the RBE of a carbon ion beam increases as the ions advance deeper into the tumor-lying region. CIRT provides the highest linear energy transfer (LET) of any currently available form of clinical radiation. This high energy delivery to the tumor results in many double-strand DNA breaks which are very difficult for the tumor to repair. Conventional radiation produces principally single strand DNA breaks which can allow many of the tumor cells to survive. The higher outright cell mortality produced by CIRT may also provide a clearer antigen signature to stimulate the patient's immune system.

Particle therapy of moving targets 
The precision of particle therapy of tumors situated in thorax and abdominal region is strongly affected by the target motion. The mitigation of its negative influence requires advanced techniques of tumor position monitoring (e.g., fluoroscopic imaging of implanted radio-opaque fiducial markers or electromagnetic detection of inserted transponders) and irradiation (gating, rescanning, gated rescanning and tumor tracking).

References

External links 
Touro University announces first combined particle therapy center in U.S.
PTCOG annual conference

Radiation therapy procedures
Medical physics
Particle physics